The Nova Scotia Scotties Tournament of Hearts is the Nova Scotia provincial women's curling tournament. The tournament is run by the Nova Scotia Curling Association. The winning team represents Nova Scotia at the Scotties Tournament of Hearts.

Past winners
(National champions in bold)

References

External links
John Murphy's Curling Page - NSLCA Open Champions
Nova Scotia Curling - Our Champions

See also

Scotties Tournament of Hearts provincial tournaments
Curling in Nova Scotia